Edwin B. Miller (June 18, 1931 – April 9, 2014) was an American National Basketball Association (NBA) player. Miller was drafted by the Milwaukee Hawks in the second round of the 1952 NBA draft. Later into the season, Miller was traded to the Baltimore Bullets for George Ratkovicz. Following the Bullets' fold, Miller was drafted in the dispersal draft by the Boston Celtics, but did not play a regular season game with the team.

References

External links
 Ed Miller at OrangeHoops.com
 Obituary

1931 births
2014 deaths
American men's basketball players
Baltimore Bullets (1944–1954) players
Basketball players from New York (state)
Centers (basketball)
Milwaukee Hawks draft picks
Milwaukee Hawks players
Sportspeople from New Rochelle, New York
Syracuse Orange men's basketball players